Perlucidibaca aquatica is a Gram-negative, strictly aerobic, rod-shaped and non-motile bacterium from the genus of Perlucidibaca which has been isolated from water from a limestone cave from Samcheok in Korea.

References

External links
Type strain of Perlucidibaca aquatica at BacDive -  the Bacterial Diversity Metadatabase

Moraxellaceae
Bacteria described in 2017